The 2008–09 Ukrainian Cup is the 18th annual season of Ukraine's football knockout competition, currently known as DATAGROUP – Football Ukraine Cup, or Kubok of Ukraine. The defending champion of this edition is Shakhtar Donetsk.

The Ukrainian Cup began with a preliminary round where teams from Druha Liha and Amateur Cup champions participated. In the second preliminary round, teams from Persha Liha were drawn into the competition and then in the round of 32 teams from Premier League entered the competition.

The winners of this competition will enter as Ukraine's cup winner representative in the play-off round of the 2009–10 UEFA Europa League. Since one of the finalists, Shakhtar Donetsk, has already qualified for European competitions for 2009–10 by virtue of their position in the Premier League, Vorskla Poltava automatically qualifies for the 2009–10 UEFA Europa League.

Team allocation 
Sixty-two teams participated in the competition.

Distribution

Round and draw dates 
All draws held at FFU headquarters (Building of Football) in Kyiv unless stated otherwise.

Competition schedule

First Preliminary Round 
In this round entered 25 teams from Druha Liha and winners of the Ukrainian Amateur Cup. The draw for the First Preliminary Round was held on July 8, 2008 while the matches took place on July 16, 2008.

Notes
  Qualify as Amateur Cup Champions of Ukraine 2007
  The match was played in Obukhiv, Kyiv Oblast
  Since Bukovyna did not arrive for their game, Kremin advanced to the next round
  The match was played in Borodianka because Bila Tserkva's home ground Trudovi Reserve was under reconstruction

Second Preliminary Round 
In this round entered all 18 teams from Persha Liha. They were drawn against the 14 winners of the First Preliminary Round, with two matches containing only Persha Liha teams. The draw was held on July 22, 2008 while the matches were played on August 6, 2008, unless otherwise noted.

Notes
  The match was played on August 4, 2008
  The match was played in Mukachevo

Bracket

Round of 32 
In this round entered all 16 teams from Premier League. They were drawn against the 16 winners from the previous round, who played home in this round. The draw was held on August 15, 2008 while the matches were played on September 13, 2008, unless otherwise noted.

Notes:

Round of 16 
In this round entered winners from the previous round (11 Premier League and 5 Persha Liha teams). The draw was random and was held on September 24, 2008. The matches were played on October 29, 2008, unless otherwise noted.

Notes:
  Penalty missed for Oleksandria – Andriy Hitchenko, for Dnipro – Vitaliy Denisov and Andriy Vorobey.

Quarterfinals 
The draw was held on October 31, 2008 and was random. The matches were played November 12, 2008.

Notes:

Semifinals 
The draw was held on November 19, 2008 and was random. The games were scheduled to be played on April 22, 2009.

Notes:

Final 

The Ukrainian Cup Final was played in Dnipro Stadium, Dnipropetrovsk on May 31, 2009.

Top goalscorers 
Status on June 1, 2009

In bold are the players that are still in the competition. Statistics can be found at RSSSF web-site.

See also 
 2008–09 Ukrainian Premier League

External links 
 Official website

References 

Ukrainian Cup seasons
Cup
Ukrainian Cup